C22 or C-22 or C.22 may refer to:
 C-22 process, a photographic process
 Boeing C-22, a military version of the Boeing 727-100/200
 , a 1909 British C-class submarine
 Aérospatiale C.22, a French target drone
 Sauber C22, a 2003 racing car
 Caldwell 22 (NGC 7662, the Blue Snowball Nebula), a planetary nebula in the constellation Andromeda
 Carbon-22 (C-22 or 22C), an isotope of carbon
 Corydoras cochui, the barredtail corydoras, a freshwater catfish
 Malignant neoplasms of liver and intrahepatic bile ducts ICD-10 code
 Centre Municipal Airport FAA LID